Belga may refer to:

 Belga (news agency), in Belgium
 Belga (cigarette), a Belgian brand
 SS Belga, a Swedish merchant ship
 Beau Belga (born 1986), Filipino basketball player
 Belga, a mid-20th century Belgian gold currency worth five Belgian francs